Civitella Alfedena is a small town and comune in the province of L'Aquila (Abruzzo, central Italy). It is located in the heart of the National Park of Abruzzo, Lazio e Molise.

Main sights
 "Lupo Appenninico Museum", dedicated to the history and the biology of the Apennine Mountains' wolf.

Twin towns
  Canal San Bovo, Italy

References

External links 
 Page dedicated to Civitella Alfedena 

Cities and towns in Abruzzo